Marketing was a British monthly trade magazine founded in 1931, and owned by Haymarket Media Group. It existed until May 2016.

History and profile
Marketing was founded in 1931. Haymarket Business Media consolidated their marketing communications portfolio resulting in Marketing being merged into an expanded Campaign magazine. The last print edition was published in May 2016.

References

External links

Business magazines published in the United Kingdom
Monthly magazines published in the United Kingdom
Defunct magazines published in the United Kingdom
Magazines published in London
Magazines about advertising
Magazines established in 1931
Magazines disestablished in 2016
Professional and trade magazines